The Queen's Award for Enterprise: International Trade (Export) (1980) was awarded on 21 April 1980, by Queen Elizabeth II.

Recipients
The following organisations were awarded this year.

 Aero-Print Ltd, of Aylesbury, Buckinghamshire.
 Alcan Plate Ltd, of Birmingham.
 Allied Colloids Ltd, of Bradford, West Yorkshire.
 Ames Crosta Babcock Ltd, of Heywood, Lancashire.
 Amey Roadstone Construction Ltd, of Abingdon, Oxfordshire.
 W. S Atkins Group Ltd, of Epsom, Surrey.
 Babcock Woodall-Duckha'm Ltd, of Crawley, West Sussex.
 Binnie & Partners, of London, SW1.
 Bostwick Doors (UK) Ltd, of Stockport, Greater Manchester.
 Brickhouse Dudley Ltd, of Tipton, West Midlands.
 Bristol Packaging Machines Ltd, of Bristol.
 British Airways Engine Overhaul Ltd, of Cardiff.
 British Nuclear Fuels Ltd, of Warrington, Cheshire.
 Capper-Neill International Ltd, of Warrington, Cheshire.
 J. H Clissold & Son Ltd, of Bradford, West Yorkshire.
 Cojana International Fashions Ltd, of London, W1.
 Coline Ltd, of Hatfield, Hertfordshire.
 Davy McKee (Minerals & Metals) Ltd, of Stockton-on-Tees, Cleveland.
 Detexomat Machinery Ltd, of High Wycombe, Buckinghamshire.
 The Byron International Division of Dobson Park (Engineering) Ltd, of Nottingham.
 Dowty Mining Equipment Ltd, of Gloucester.
 Dowty Rotol Ltd, of Gloucester.
 Drallim Telecommunications Ltd, of Bexhill-on-Sea, East Sussex.
 The Drum Engineering Company Ltd, of Bradford, West Yorkshire.
 Electroheating (London) Ltd, of London, SW19.
 S. & S Ellis Ltd, of London, E3.
 The Financial Times Ltd, of London, EC4.
 Frankel Microfilm Holdings Ltd, of Stanmore, Middlesex.
 G.E.C. Turbine Generators Ltd, of Rugby.
 G.T.S. Flexible Materials Ltd, of Bracknell, Berkshire.
 Gardners Transformers Ltd, of Christchurch, Dorset.
 Gemmill and Dunsmore Ltd, of Preston, Lancashire.
 James Gentles and Son, of Edinburgh.
 Hardy Spicer Ltd, of Birmingham.
 Healey Mouldings Ltd, of Warley, West Midlands.
 Hobourn-Eaton Ltd, of Rochester, Kent.
 Hughes Tool Company Ltd, of London, W1.
 I.D.M. Electronics Ltd, of Reading, Berkshire.
 Jackstone Froster Ltd, of Grimsby, South Humberside.
 Kearney & Trecker Marwin Ltd, of Brighton, East Sussex.
 Lamcoat Papers Ltd, of Clitheroe, Lancashire.
 Lansing Bagnall Ltd, of Basingstoke, Hampshire.
 Lee Howl & Co. Ltd, of Tipton, West Midlands.
 Lewmar Marine Ltd, of Havant, Hampshire.
 Linotype-Paul Ltd, of Cheltenham, Gloucestershire.
 R A Lister & Company, Ltd, of Dursley, Gloucestershire.
 Loewy Robertson Engineering Company Ltd, of Poole, Dorset.
 McCain International Ltd, of Scarborough, North Yorkshire.
 Macdonald Greenlees Ltd, of Edinburgh.
 Sir M MacDonald & Partners Ltd, of Cambridge.
 Manesty Machines Ltd, of Liverpool.
 Marconi Radar Systems Ltd, of Chelmsford, Essex.
 J. Marr and Son Ltd, of Hull, Humberside.
 The Mars Money Systems Division of Mars Ltd, of Slough, Berkshire.
 The Mercantile and General Reinsurance Company Ltd, of London, EC.2.
 The Electrical Division of Newage Engineers Ltd, of Stamford, Lincolnshire.
 Norman Magnetics Ltd, of Farnborough, Hampshire.
 Oilfield Inspection Services Ltd, of Aberdeen.
 Peboc Ltd, of Llangefni, Gwynedd.
 Pinneys Smokehouses Ltd, of Annan, Dumfriesshire.
 Quantel Ltd, of Caterham, Surrey.
 Racal-Datacom Ltd, of Salisbury, Wiltshire.
 Racal-Redac Ltd, of Tewkesbury, Gloucestershire.
 The Rank Taylor Hobson Division of Rank Precision Industries Ltd, of Leicester.
 Rank Xerox Ltd, London, NW1.
 Raychem Ltd, of Swindon, Wiltshire.
 Redifon Simulation Ltd, of Crawley, West Sussex.
 Redler Conveyors Ltd, of Stroud, Gloucestershire.
 Reynolds Medical Ltd, of Hertford.
 Stewart Ross and Company Ltd, of Sandridge, St. Albans, Hertfordshire.
 Round Oak Steel Works Ltd, of Brierley Hill, West Midlands.
 The Ryvita Company Ltd, of Poole, Dorset.
 The Aircraft Division of Short Brothers Ltd, of Belfast.
 A. O Smith Harvestore Products Ltd, of Eye, Suffolk.
 Sodastream Ltd, of Peterborough, Cambridgeshire.
 Sony (UK) Ltd, of Bridgend, Mid-Glamorganshire.
 Standard Chartered Bank, of London, EC4.
 Trusthouse Forte Ltd, of London, SW1.
 J. G Turney & Son Ltd, of London, SW1.
 The Design and Projects Division of Vickers Ltd, of Eastleigh, Hampshire.
 The Howson-Algraphy Group of Vickers Ltd, of Leeds.
 John Walker and Sons Ltd, of London, SW1.
 Wearwell Ltd, of London, E1.
 Josiah Wedgwood & Sons Ltd, of Stoke-on-Trent, Staffordshire.
 Westall Richardson Ltd, of Sheffield.
 Whatman Biochemicals Ltd, of Maidstone, Kent.
 Wimet Ltd, of Coventry, West Midlands.

References

Queen's Award for Enterprise: International Trade (Export)
1980 in the United Kingdom